The Donners' Company (formerly Donner/Shuler-Donner Productions) is the film production company of director Richard Donner and producer Lauren Shuler Donner, founded in 1986. It is notable for the Free Willy and X-Men films.

History

Donner/Shuler-Donner Productions 
In 1986, film producer Lauren Shuler Donner announced that she would end her production deal with The Walt Disney Studios. She announced that she would merge with Warner Bros.-based Richard Donner Productions, to create Donner/Shuler-Donner Productions, to be operating on the Warner Bros. lot in Burbank, California.

The first film released under the name was Radio Flyer, which was directed by Richard Donner, produced by Lauren, and it was released by Columbia Pictures in 1992. It flopped at the box office.

The banner made its first major success in 1993 with box office hits Dave and Free Willy. The latter's success spawned two sequels, and a television series. That year, the studio and Warner Bros. originally made a deal with Hammer Film Productions to do remake film projects based on its existing UK film productions.

In 1994, the studio hit its first television project, with an animated adaption of Free Willy, and it was aired on ABC for two seasons.

The Donners' Company 
In 1999, it was announced that Donner/Shuler-Donner Productions was renamed to the better-sounding name The Donners' Company. On April 4, 2000, it was signed a deal with NBC Studios to produce shows for the NBC television network.

That same year, the studio scored a major success with X-Men, which was an instant box office hit, grossing over $296.8 million worldwide.

In 2001, The Donners' Company signed a deal with Winchester Films to produce its feature films from its own.

More recently, the company was producing two X-Men series for television, including Legion on FX, and The Gifted on Fox. In 2019, the latter was cancelled months before the former concluded its third and final season.

Richard Donner died on July 5, 2021. He was 91.

Filmography

1990s

2000s

2010s

2020s

Television

In development

Television

References 

Film production companies of the United States
Television production companies of the United States
Entertainment companies based in California
1986 establishments in California
Mass media companies established in 1986